Rolnick is a surname. Notable people with the surname include:

Harry Rolnick, American author, editor, and music critic
Neil Rolnick (born 1947), American composer and educator

See also
 Rolnick Observatory, astronomical observatory in Westport, Connecticut